Markolf H. Niemz (born 1964 in Hofheim am Taunus) is a German physicist, biophysicist, and author. He is a full professor at Heidelberg University.

Biography 
Markolf Niemz studied physics at Frankfurt University and Heidelberg University, and bioengineering at the University of California, San Diego. In 1992, he submitted his PhD thesis on the construction of a pulse compressed Nd:YLF laser to study the plasma-induced ablation of tissue.

Niemz worked as head of the Optical Spectroscopy department at the Fraunhofer Institute for Physical Measurement Techniques (IPM) in Freiburg until 1999. In 2000, he has been appointed the Chair of Medical Engineering/Biomedical Engineering at Heidelberg University, settled as a full professor at the Medical Faculty of Mannheim. Since then, Niemz has been director of the Mannheim Biomedical Engineering Laboratories (MABEL), a joint venture of Heidelberg University and the Mannheim University of Applied Sciences. His research focuses on "light and matter", laser–tissue interactions, biosignals, and philosophy based on physics. He was the first scientist worldwide to apply ultrashort laser pulses to dentistry for a painfree treatment of caries.

Niemz is also involved in a new branch of mortality research, the so-called near-death experiences. With his scientific novel Lucy mit c (Books on Demand, 2005), he became well known to a wide audience for comparing near-death experiences with relativistic effects predicted by Albert Einstein. Niemz teaches that eternity is at the speed of light when all distances turn zero. He also comes up with a new, physical explanation of near-death experiences: If some part of us plunges into the light while we die, the so-called searchlight effect lets us perceive a dark tunnel with a bright light at the other end. Light itself is cosmic memory and provides the life review that is frequently reported by the dying.

Niemz' novel Lucy mit c was the first self-published book ever to appear on the German non-fiction bestseller list Gong. Also Lucy im Licht (Droemer, 2007), the second volume of his Lucy trilogy, and Bin ich, wenn ich nicht mehr bin? (Kreuz, 2011) turned into German bestsellers. From the royalties of his Lucy trilogy, Niemz founded the charitable and non-profit foundation Stiftung Lucys Kinder. This foundation serves to ensure that also children from the poorest countries in this world will get access to love and understanding.

In his book Seeing Our World Through Different Eyes (Wipf & Stock, 2020), Niemz invites us to understand the world through the Eastern concept of Advaita (in English: non-duality). Many terms that we conceive as opposing (space and time, being and becoming, chicken and egg, creator and creation) would actually be two sides of the same coin. Niemz is suggesting to not speak of the nouns "space" and "time", but rather of the adjectives "spatial" and "temporal". These would be properties of matter.

In his book Wie geht leben? (Allegria, 2021), Niemz is even going one step further and offers an interesting alternative to bypass dualism. He is converting nouns in our language systematically into verb forms. Viruses, bacteria, and cancer cells would primarily be processes rather than objects: an informing ("vir-ing"), an acting ("bacteri-ing"), and a miscommunicating ("cancer-ing"). Niemz even conceives humans and God as verb forms. By doing so, he closely follows his master Alfred North Whitehead.

Awards 
    Karl-Freudenberg-Prize of the Heidelberg Academy of Sciences in 1995 for his work on "laser–tissue interactions".
    Research Fellow at Harvard Medical School in 1995 with a grant from the Deutsche Forschungsgemeinschaft.
    Scholarship holder of the Studienstiftung des Deutschen Volkes 1987–1992.

Publications 
 Laser–Tissue Interactions – Fundamentals and Applications. Springer, Berlin Heidelberg New York 2019, 4th edition, .
 Lucy mit c – Mit Lichtgeschwindigkeit ins Jenseits. Books on Demand, Norderstedt 2005, .
 Lucy im Licht – Dem Jenseits auf der Spur. Droemer, München 2007, .
 Lucys Vermächtnis – Der Schlüssel zur Ewigkeit. Droemer, München 2009, .
 Bin ich, wenn ich nicht mehr bin? – Ein Physiker entschlüsselt die Ewigkeit. Kreuz, Freiburg 2011, .
 Sinn – Ein Physiker verknüpft Erkenntnis mit Liebe. Kreuz, Freiburg 2013, .
 Sich selbst verlieren und alles gewinnen – Ein Physiker greift nach den Sternen. Kreuz, Freiburg 2015, .
 Ichwahn – Ein Physiker erklärt, warum Abgrenzung gegen unsere Natur ist. Ludwig, München 2017, .
 How Science Can Help Us Live in Peace – Darwin, Einstein, Whitehead. Universal Publishers, Irvine 2018, .
 Die Welt mit anderen Augen sehen – Ein Physiker ermutigt zu mehr Spiritualität. Gütersloher Verlagshaus, Gütersloh 2020, .
 Seeing Our World Through Different Eyes – Thoughts on Space and Time, Abraham Lincoln, and God. Wipf and Stock, Eugene 2020, .
 Wie geht leben? – In Prozessen denken, verstehen und gesunden. Allegria, Berlin 2021, .

References

External links 
 Official website of Markolf Niemz
 Lucy's Children Foundation
 Books by and about Markolf Niemz in the German National Library

1964 births
Academic staff of Heidelberg University
Biophysicists
German male writers
Near-death experience researchers
Living people